International Security is a peer-reviewed academic journal in the field of international and national security. It was founded in 1976 and is edited by the Belfer Center for Science and International Affairs at Harvard University and published four times a year by MIT Press, both of Cambridge, Massachusetts. The current editor-in-chief is Steven E. Miller (Harvard University).

International Security is considered among the leading journals in the field of International Relations. According to the Journal Citation Reports, the journal has a 2017 impact factor of 4.135, ranking it 2nd out of 85 journals in the category "International Relations".  Along with the journal Security Studies, it is the most prominent journal dedicated to security studies. Articles in International Security tend to deploy qualitative methods, in particular qualitative historical analysis. Articles are also more likely to include policy prescriptions than other leading IR journals.

The first article in International Security was Hedley Bull's "Arms Control and World Order." Each issue has an average length of 208 pages.

References

External links
Official website

International relations journals
International security
MIT Press academic journals
Publications established in 1976
English-language journals
Quarterly journals